The 1964 United States Senate election in Ohio took place on November 3, 1964. Incumbent Democratic Senator Stephen M. Young was re-elected to a second term in office, narrowly defeating Republican U.S. Representative Robert Taft, Jr.

Democratic primary

Candidates
Albert T. Ball
John Glenn, member of the Mercury Seven and first American to orbit the planet Earth
William Hotchkiss
Stephen M. Young, incumbent Senator since 1959

Results

Republican primary

Candidates
Ted W. Brown, Ohio Secretary of State since 1951
Robert Taft Jr., U.S. Representative from Cincinnati (representing Ohio at-large) and scion of the Taft family

Results

General election

Results

See also 
 1964 United States Senate elections

References

Ohio
1964
1964 Ohio elections